Lomvula Mndzebele was the Queen Regent of Swaziland briefly in 1815 after the death of Ndvungunye until Sobhuza I became the king of Swaziland.

References

Women rulers in Africa
Swazi monarchs
19th-century monarchs in Africa
19th-century women rulers